Eden Township is one of eighteen townships in Carroll County, Iowa, United States. As of the 2000 census, its population was 630. According to the USGS, it contains two cemeteries: Elba and Sacred Heart.

References

External links
 City-Data.com

Townships in Carroll County, Iowa
Townships in Iowa